Alligator Creek may refer to:

United States

 Alligator Creek (East Bay River tributary), Florida
 Alligator Creek (Horse Creek tributary), Georgia
 Alligator Creek (Milligan Creek tributary), Georgia
 Alligator Creek (Suwannee River tributary), Georgia
 Alligator Creek (Little Ocmulgee River tributary), Georgia
 Alligator Creek (Montana), in the Missouri River watershed, Montana

Australia
 Alligator Creek (Northern Territory), in the Wildman River watershed, Northern Territory
Alligator Creek, Queensland (Cairns), a creek around which Malay Town was built in the early 20th century
 Alligator Creek, Queensland (Mackay), a coastal rural locality
 Alligator Creek, Queensland (Rockhampton), a tributary of the Fitzroy River (Queensland)
 Alligator Creek, Queensland (Townsville), a rural locality
 Alligator Creek (Western Australia), a watercourse in Western Australia

See also
 Alligator River (disambiguation)
 Battle of the Tenaru, aka Battle of Alligator Creek, Guadalcanal, WWII